The 1922 Coppa Italia Final was the inaugural final of the Coppa Italia. The match was played on 16 July 1922 between Vado and Udinese. Vado won 1–0 the first Coppa Italia, the first of the two teams reaching the trophy without playing in the First Division and the only one who never played it.

Match

References 
Coppa Italia 1922 statistics at rsssf.com
 https://www.calcio.com/calendario/ita-coppa-italia-1922-finale/2/
 https://www.worldfootball.net/schedule/ita-coppa-italia-1922-finale/2/

Coppa Italia Finals
Udinese Calcio matches